Green Grass of Wyoming is a 1948 American Western film directed by Louis King and starring Peggy Cummins, Charles Coburn and Robert Arthur.

The screenplay, written by Martin Berkeley, is based on the third book in the popular, "My Friend Flicka" trilogy, written by Mary O'Hara. The film follows the further adventures of the McLaughlin family who live on a horse ranch in Wyoming. Marilyn Monroe appeared as an uncredited extra.

The original cast from the first two films did not reprise their roles in the third.

Plot
Beaver Greenway, a longtime horse owner with a drinking problem, is upset because one of his mares has been lured away by Thunderhead, the wild stallion that previously belonged to Rob and Nell McLaughlin. He goes to Goose Bar Ranch to assist in the hunt for the wild stallion, who is now well known for taking the Albino's place in stealing mares from many different states but the McLaughlins no longer have any control of the horse.

Ken McLaughlin returns home to his parents from a horse-buying trip with Crown Jewel, a trotter. Rob is skeptical about the purchase, more so when Crown Jewel develops altitude sickness in the Wyoming hills.

Ken goes on a date with Greenway's granddaughter Carey. A veterinarian advises Crown Jewel be put down due to her congested lungs, but Beaver Greenway, a former sulky driver, recommends a treatment that works.

Thunderhead returns and lifts the mare's spirits. Crown Jewel is taken to Ohio to compete in the Governor's Cup sweepstakes, where Ken McLaughlin has entered his own horse, Sundance. Ken was going to ride Crown Jewel, but Sundance wins. However, all of the McLaughlins are proud of Crown Jewel's effort, particularly when they learn she is pregnant.

Cast
 Peggy Cummins as Carey Greenway
 Charles Coburn as Beaver Greenway
 Robert Arthur as Ken McLaughlin
 Lloyd Nolan as Rob McLaughlin
 Burl Ives as Gus
 Geraldine Wall as Nell McLaughlin

Production
Parts of the film were shot in Strawberry Valley, Three Lakes, Kanab Race Track, Rockville Road, Panguitch Lake, and Cedar Breaks National Monument in Utah.

The final race during the last 18 minutes of the film was filmed in Lancaster, Ohio at the Fairfield County Fair Grounds.

References

External links
 
 
 
 

1948 films
1948 Western (genre) films
American Western (genre) films
Films about horses
Films directed by Louis King
20th Century Fox films
Films scored by Cyril J. Mockridge
Films set in Ohio
Films set in Wyoming
Films shot in Ohio
Films shot in Utah
Films based on works by Mary O'Hara
1940s English-language films
1940s American films